Weingraben is a town in the district of Oberpullendorf in the Austrian state of Burgenland.

Etymology
Translated word by word "Weingraben" would mean "ditch of wine". In Croatian it's "bajngrob". The Hungarian name also refers to "wine".

Population

Sights
Weingraben is famous for its marvelous hiking trails. From the centre it's not far to the chapel and the water reservoir. There are many hiking trails to the mountains of Landsee. You can also walk to the relaxing "Geißmühle" (= goat grinder). There's the small brook "Rabnitz" and a farm.

References

Cities and towns in Oberpullendorf District